These are the Billboard magazine R&B albums that reached number-one in 1974.

Chart history

See also
1974 in music
R&B number-one hits of 1974 (USA)

1974